The Big Ten Conference first sponsored football in 1896. This is a list of its annual standings from 1959 to present.

Standings

References

Big Ten Conference
Standings